Grilled cold noodles (Chinese: 烤冷面, pinyin: kǎolěngmiàn) is a local specialized snack of the Chinese province of Heilongjiang. It is a side dish, usually sold at night markets or roadside stands rather than in restaurants.

Grilled cold noodles are cooked using special noodles resembling pieces of paper, with eggs, onions and other auxiliary materials, The main condiment is sweet bean sauce or gochujang.

Traditionally, there are three ways to cook the dish: grilling, teppanyaki and frying.

History 
There are two main theories as to the birthplace of grilled cold noodles. Some people believe that the dish originated in Mishan, while others believe that it started in Mudanjiang.

According to legend, a man called Gai Guofeng (盖国峰) who sold snacks at the backdoor of Second Middle School of Mishan City liked to grill cold noodles for himself as a dish to go with wine. Unexpectedly, students of the Second Middle School of Mishan City found that the dish was very delicious, and it became very popular in Mishan.

However, the original cold noodle dish was not soft enough, and was a little hard to chew. After the use of softer noodles, grilled cold noodles was gradually accepted by people all around China. However, grilled cold noodles are still known for their chewiness. The chewy texture comes from gluten.

Variations 
 Grilled: The noodles and sauce are put in a grilling basket.  
 Fry: Popular primarily in Mishan. The noodles are fried and then brushed with sauce.
 Teppanyaki: This is the most common way to cook the dish using Teppanyaki cold noodles with onion, eggs and sausage.

References 

Chinese noodle dishes
Street food in China
Miyun District